"Power of One" is a pop ballad written by Merril Bainbridge and produced by Siew for Bainbridge's debut album The Garden (1995). It was released as the album's third single in October 1995 (see 1995 in music) in Australia as a CD single. The song is about how we underestimate the power of love.

The song made its debut in the Australian ARIA Singles Chart at number forty-three, making it Bainbridge's third song to reach the top fifty. It peaked at twenty-one, spending seven weeks in the top fifty.

Track listing
"Power of One" (single mix) – 4:14
"Power of One" (album mix) – 4:06
"Reasons Why" (demo) – 2:58

Charts

References

1995 singles
Merril Bainbridge songs
1995 songs
Songs written by Merril Bainbridge